Butheric (died 390) was a Roman general of Gothic descent. Under the reign of emperor Theodosius I, Butheric was stationed in Thessalonica as a magister militum. In 390, Butheric was murdered by the rebellious populace after having arrested a popular chariot racer. In retaliation, Theodosius authorized his Gothic soldiers to punish the people of city, in what is known as the Massacre of Thessalonica.

References

Sources
 Alexander Demandt: Magister militum. In: Paulys Realencyclopädie der classischen Altertumswissenschaft (RE). Supplementband XII, Stuttgart 1970, Sp. 553–790, hier 717.

390 deaths
Year of birth unknown
4th-century Gothic people
Ancient Roman murder victims
Gothic warriors
Magistri militum
People murdered in Greece
Byzantine people of Germanic descent
Lynching deaths